Adoxa moschatellina, the moschatel, five-faced bishop, hollowroot, muskroot, townhall clock, tuberous crowfoot or Good Friday plant, is a species of flowering plant in the family Adoxaceae. This herbaceous perennial has a holarctic distribution occurring at low altitudes in high latitudes, and at high altitudes in the south of its range. It prefers damp shady situations.

Description  
Adoxa moschatellina is a rhizomatous plant growing in mats with a delicate appearance. These flowers give the species one of its common names, "Town Hall clock", as they face outwards in four directions at 90 degrees to each other, resembling the four faces of a town clock. The flowers have five petals and five stamens, but the stamens are divided into two parts creating the impression that there  are ten stamens. When it is not in flower it can be hard to tell A. moschatellina from other plants with similar foliage. The plant and its flowers have a musk-like scent, which it emits towards evening when the dew falls. If the plant is bruised this scent disappears.

Distribution
Adoxa moschatellina has a boreal, circumpolar distribution in Europe, Asia and North America. It is widespread and common in most parts of the British Isles but becomes scarce in the north and west of Scotland and parts of eastern England. It is absent from Ireland. Its distribution in parts of Wales is localised, occurring only at sites where are base rich soil, such as Coed Dolgarrog National Nature Reserve in Conwy.

Habitat and ecology
Adoxa moschatellina grows in humid brown soils under shade on the banks of rivers and streams, in deciduous woodlands and under hedgerows. It does infrequently grow in shaded base-rich localities in uplands. This spring-flowering species dies back after flowering in May or June in low-lying areas. The flowers are self-fertile and this species may reproduce by producing seeds or by vegetative spread. The rather plain flowers of A. moschatellina are pollinated by flies and nocturnal moths which do not rely on colour to pollinate plants. It is parasitized by the rare smut Melanotaenium adoxae.

References

External links

 Moschatel, from "A Modern Herbal"

Adoxaceae
Ephemeral plants
Flora of temperate Asia
Flora of Canada
Flora of Europe
Flora of Pakistan
Flora of New York (state)
Taxa named by Carl Linnaeus